Husn Banu Ghazanfar , (born February 1, 1957) is a politician in Afghanistan, formerly served as the Minister of Women's Affairs. She is also a writer, a poet, and a speaker.

Early life and education
Ghazanfar, daughter of Abdul Ghafar, was born in Balkh Province on February 1, 1957. She graduated from Sultan Razia High School in Mazar-e-Sharif and obtained her BA and master's degree on Literature and Sociology from Stavropol. In around 1983 she was involved in Kabul University's Literature Faculty program. About two years later, she went to Petersburg, Russia, to obtain her doctorate in Philology. An ethnic Uzbek, she is fluent in Dari (Persian), Pashto, Uzbek, Russian, and she knows a little Turkish and English.

Career
In 2003, she was appointed as the Head of the Literature Faculty. In July 2006, Ghazanfar received vote of confidence from the National Assembly of Afghanistan (Parliament) to become Minister of Women's Affairs.

Ghazanfar has also worked as:

Member of the High Council of the Ministry of Higher Education
Member of Speranto International Association of Women
Member of the International Association of Turk Zabanan
Member of the Board of Directors of Hakim Nasir Khisro Balkhi Association.

She has written a number of scientific articles and essays, which have been published in the national and international newspapers. She is also a poet and writes works of literature, her books are The Human Fate, Predations in the 21st Century, The Secrets of Beauty and Attraction. The book Self Realization was translated by her.

References

External links

Biography of Dr. Husn Banu Ghazanfar 

 
Afghan feminists
Living people
1957 births
Afghan Uzbek politicians 
People from Balkh Province
Women's ministers of Afghanistan
Women government ministers of Afghanistan